(Spanish for "The Vanguard") is a Spanish daily newspaper, founded in 1881. It is printed in Spanish and, since 3 May 2011, also in Catalan (Spanish copy is automatically translated into Catalan). It has its headquarters in Barcelona and is Catalonia's leading newspaper.

Despite being mostly distributed in Catalonia,  has Spain's fourth-highest circulation among general-interest newspapers, trailing only the three main Madrid dailies – ,  and ABC, all of which are national newspapers with offices and local editions throughout the country.

Its editorial line leans to the centre of politics and is moderate in its opinions, although in Francoist Spain it followed Francoist ideology and to this day has Catholic sensibilities and strong ties to the Spanish nobility through the Godó family.

History and profile

La Vanguardia's newspaper history began in Barcelona on 1 February 1881 when two businessmen from Igualada, Carlos and Bartolomé Godó, first published the paper. It was defined as a Diario político de avisos y notícias (Political Newspaper of Announcements and News), intended as a means of communication for a faction of the Liberal Party that wanted to gain control over the Barcelona city council.

On 31 December 1887, the paper published its last edition as a party organ, and the next day, 1 January 1888, the first day of the Universal Exposition of Barcelona, it presented a new, politically independent format with morning and afternoon editions.

It is one of the oldest papers in Spain, and is the only Catalan newspaper that has survived all the Spanish regime changes, from the restoration of Alfonso XII to the 21st century.

La Vanguardia is part of the Grupo Godó. Carlos Godó Valls took over the business in 1931. His death was one year after the death of his wife, Montserrat Muntañola Trinxet, succeeding as President his son Javier Godó Muntañola in 1987.

From 1939 to 1978 its title included the word Española to better accommodate the new state ideology. The paper was one of two major dailies in Francoist Spain together with ABC. In the late 1970s and 1980s La Vanguardia had close connections with Convergence and Union alliance.

In 1987 La Vanguardia received the second largest amount of state aid.

La Vanguardia was published in berliner format until 2 October 2007 when it began to use tabloid format. The daily was awarded the World's Best Designed Newspaper for 1994 by the Society for News Design (SND).

Circulation
The circulation of La Vanguardia was 221,451 copies in February 1970 and 218,390 copies in February 1975. Five years later the circulation of the paper was 188,555 copies in February 1980.

In 1993 La Vanguardia had a circulation of 208,029 copies, making it the fifth best selling newspaper in Spain. In 1994 it was the fourth best selling newspaper in the country with a circulation of 207,112 copies.

La Vanguardia had a circulation of 205,000 copies in 2001. Its circulation was 203,000 copies in 2003. Between June 2006 and July 2007 the daily had a circulation of 209,735 copies. The 2008 circulation of the paper was 213,413 copies. It was 196,824 copies in 2011.

Language
The newspaper prints daily in two parallel editions, one in Spanish and, since 3 May 2011, another one in Catalan.

Before the birth of the Catalan edition, letters to the editor submitted in Catalan were always left untranslated.

Notable contributors
John Carlin
Julià Guillamon
Quim Monzó
Fernando Krahn
Pedro Madueño
Sergi Pàmies
Pilar Rahola
Xavier Sala-i-Martin

See also

Gaziel

References

Further reading
 Merrill, John C. and Harold A. Fisher. The world's great dailies: profiles of fifty newspapers (1980) pp 334–37

External links
La Vanguardia newspaper website

 
1881 establishments in Spain
Catalan-language newspapers
Newspapers published in Barcelona
Daily newspapers published in Spain
Publications established in 1881
Spanish-language newspapers
Spanish news websites